This article shows a list of railway stations in Morocco. The stations are managed by the national operator ONCF.

Stations served 
In cooperation with bus-operator Supratours the ONCF offers combination-tickets to many cities without a railway station. These destinations are not included in the list below.

Existing

Proposed 
The current line to Oued Zem will be extended to Beni Mellal.

Closed 
 Bab Ftouh, Fez
 Sidi Hrazem, Fez

Freight only 
Only passenger railway stations are listed above. Settlements such as Agadir and Tetouan have stations exclusively for the cement/freight network.

See also 

 Transport in Morocco

References 

 
Railway stations
Railway stations
Transport in Morocco